Morgan G. Bulkeley Stadium was a sporting event stadium located in Hartford, Connecticut and the site of Babe Ruth's final exhibition baseball game. The facility was home to the Eastern League's Hartford Senators, the Hartford Blues of the National Football League, and included a  mile dirt oval for motor sports. Originally named Clarkin Field from 1921–1927, the stadium was renamed for former Connecticut Governor and First President of the National League, Morgan Bulkeley in 1928.

James H. Clarkin, owner of the Hartford Senators, replaced the old Wethersfield Avenue Baseball Grounds (also sometimes called Clarkin Field or Clarkin's Field) with the new Clarkin Field in 1921. After a series of rain delays, the ballpark finally opened on May 4, 1921.

The ballpark was located at Hanmer Street and George Street off of Franklin Avenue. There was a fine playing surface laid out and Clarkin had erected one of the best minor league structures in the country, with a stand of steel and concrete and dressing rooms, shower baths and complete modern equipment. In 1927 fire destroyed the stand but it was rebuilt in less than a month. After only playing away games during the beginning of the season, the Hartford Senators returned to Hartford for a gala opening of Bulkeley Stadium in July 1927. According to the Hartford Courant, Clarkin died 6 years later on March 12, 1933.

Between 1921 and 1952, the stadium was the home of Hartford's various minor league baseball teams: the Hartford Senators, Hartford Blues, Hartford Laurels, Hartford Bees, and Hartford Chiefs.  Lou Gehrig, Jim Thorpe, Ty Cobb, Jimmie Foxx, Leo Durocher, Hank Greenberg, Warren Spahn, Ted Williams, and Johnny Sain all played at Bulkeley Stadium at one point in their careers. When the Boston Braves moved to Milwaukee at the end of the 1952 season, Hartford's minor league team was relocated.

On September 30, 1945, George Herman "Babe" Ruth Jr. played in a charity game at Bulkeley Stadium for the Savitt Gems. The Gems were a semi-pro club sponsored by Bill Savitt who created the team in 1930 as part of the Greater Hartford Twilight Baseball League.  At an old age of 50, Ruth entered the game as a pinch-hitter and grounded out to the opposing pitcher.  The ballgame was Babe Ruth's final appearance of his playing career. Bulkeley Stadium fell into disarray and was demolished in 1960. The location of the stadium is currently a nursing home. A historical stone marker was dedicated there in 1998.

Contemporary aerial photos and plans (shown on the GHTBL page) help to pin down the location more specifically. The diamond was in the northeast corner of the field. George Street bordered the right field fence. Hanmer Street and Goodrich Street ran to the third base side of the field from the east, and then continued westward from George Street. Chester Street was to the south, half a block beyond the left field fence. Cowles Street was to the north, nearly a block beyond the first base side. Franklin Avenue paralleled George Street, a block or more to the east of the ballpark and intersected by Hanmer and Goodrich. A convenient reference point is the Naylor School, which was and still is to southeast of the ballpark location, on the west side of Franklin between Chester and Cromwell. The 1940 city directory gives the address as 60 Hanmer.

References

External links
Greater Hartford Twilight Baseball League
Many pictures of the ballpark (along with text which closely matches this article)
Friends of Vintage Baseball
Neighborhoods: Southside Hartford
History of Connecticut Racetracks
More information
More about this ballpark's predecessor

Defunct National Football League venues
American football venues in Connecticut
Defunct minor league baseball venues
Defunct baseball venues in the United States
Hartford Blues
Sports venues in Hartford, Connecticut
Sports venues in Hartford County, Connecticut